As the governing body of rugby league, the International Rugby League (IRL) is responsible for maintaining and implementing rules that determine whether a rugby league player is eligible to represent a particular country in officially recognised international matches and tournaments.

Eligibility rules
The IRL eligibility rules outline that a player is eligible to represent:
 the nation in which they were born;
 the nation in which either of their parents were born;
 the nation in which any of their grandparents were born;
 the nation which is their primary place of residence.

Primary place of residence is defined as the nation in which the player has resided for the preceding five years. This was increased from three years in October 2016.

Tier system
In October 2016, the IRL introduced a tier system for classifying its member nations:
 Tier 2: All other full members of the IRL
 Tier 3: Affiliate and observer members of the IRL

Under this system, dual eligible players can elect to represent both a tier 1 nation and a tier 2 or 3 nation. Players are only permitted to represent one nation in a calendar year, but are otherwise free to change between their elected nations without a stand-down period or similar. Players can change their tier 2 or 3 nation once every four years, but are not permitted to change their tier 1 nation (except between England and Great Britain).

France have been a tier 1 nation for wheelchair rugby league since May 2021.

Previously, players were permitted to change between nations once every two years or at the end of the next Rugby League World Cup, whichever was sooner.

Other rules
Eligibility can be established through a biological or adoptive parent.

A player is considered to have elected to play for a nation if they are included in a 19-man gameday squad for a full international match or a final squad for a rugby league nines tournament. Prior to February 2020, a player was only deemed to have elected to represent a nation if they took the field in a full international match. Selection in a junior (e.g. Under-20s), student, or any other representative match does not constitute electing a nation.

Breaches and controversies
In 2006, Australian-born Nathan Fien represented  in two matches of the 2006 Tri-Nations, claiming to be eligible through his grandmother. It was subsequently discovered that his New Zealand-born ancestor was, in fact, his great-grandmother, which did not establish his eligibility. He was banned from competing in the rest of the tournament and New Zealand was stripped of the points gained for their win against . The scandal was known as "Grannygate". Fien played a further 20 Tests for New Zealand after completing his three-year residency period in October 2007 and becoming eligible.

In 2008, the IRL (then known as the RLIF) ruled that Fuifui Moimoi and Taniela Tuiaki were not eligible to represent  at the 2008 Rugby League World Cup as the rules at the time dictated that players were only permitted to change nations once every two years. Both players had switched from Tonga to New Zealand in 2007, but wanted to represent Tonga at the tournament after they were not selected by New Zealand. The decision was challenged in the Supreme Court of New South Wales, with Justice Richard Weeks White ruling that Moimoi and Tuiaki were to be permitted to play for Tonga from 12 November 2008 onwards, exactly two years after their most recent match for Tonga. Neither player appeared at the tournament as Tonga was eliminated prior to that date. Moimoi was subsequently reselected by New Zealand in 2009.

Response
In comparison to other international sports, the IRL's previous eligibility rules, which permitted players to change nations every two years, were described as "an outlier in terms of how little impediment there was to players representing more than one country." The current rules have been described as a farce that has cheapened international tournaments.

IRL development officer Tas Baitieri stated in September 2016 that the current eligibility system was designed to produce higher quality and more balanced international tournaments. Dual eligible players who are not selected by their tier 1 nation can represent tier 2 and 3 nations without affecting their chances of being reselected by their tier 1 nation, strengthening the tier 2 and 3 nations in the interim.

The current eligibility system has also been praised for allowing members of diaspora populations to represent their multiple national identities. Under the previous system, many dual eligible players were conflicted between representing their cultural heritage and the financial benefits of representing tier 1 nations, particularly Australia and its domestic State of Origin series. As the Australian Rugby League Commission's eligibility rules for State of Origin require players to be eligible for Australia, dual eligible players are now able to be selected for State of Origin while representing a tier 2 or 3 nation.

References

Rugby league
Sport and nationality